Jason Blair is an American writer and game designer.

Jason Blair may also refer to:

 Jason Blair, contestant on the British reality television programme Dumped
Jason Blair (basketball) from 2008–09 LEB Oro season
Jason Blair (coach) from 2011 AFL Under 18 Championships
Jason Blair (politician) from United States House of Representatives elections, 2006

See also
Jayson Blair (actor) (born 1984), American actor
Jayson Blair (born 1976), former reporter for The New York Times